Tidar may refer to:
 Tidar, Bashagard, Hormozgan Province
 Tidar, Hajjiabad, Hormozgan Province
 Tidar, Kerman
 Tidar, Lorestan